Eilica bicolor is a species of ground spider in the family Gnaphosidae. It is found in a range from the United States to Honduras, Cuba, and Jamaica.

References

Gnaphosidae
Articles created by Qbugbot
Spiders described in 1896